Schistura afasciata is a species of ray-finned fish in the genus Schistura.

References 

afasciata
Fish described in 1981
Taxa named by Petre Mihai Bănărescu